Gladys Chai von der Laage (born Chai Ng Mei on 22 February 1953) is a German sports photographer of Malaysian Chinese origin. She has previously competed at the 1972 Summer Olympics as a Malaysian pentathlete.

Early life
Chai Ng Mei was born on 22 February 1953 to Chinese parents.

Career
When she was 14 years old, Chai won a silver in the high jump event of the 1967 Southeast Asian Games. She trained in West Germany in 1971. The following year, she represented Malaysia in the women's pentathlon event of 1972 Summer Olympics but was forced to retire because of an injury. Chai won four golds at the 1973 and 1975 SEA games; 2 each in high jump and pentathlon. She finished in the ninth place at the 1974 British Commonwealth Games's women's high jump event and bagged another gold medal in the high jump event of 1979 Southeast Asian Games.

Later she became a sports photographer and was awarded the German Athletics Association's Media Prize in 2016 after more than twenty years of her work in this profession. The website Sports Reference cites her as "one of the world's best-known sports photographers".

Personal life
Chai married a West German sports journalist . Together the couple established their own agency ASVOM. Laage died in 2006.

References

External links
 

1953 births
Living people
Athletes from Cologne
Sports photographers
German women photographers
Malaysian female athletes
Malaysian high jumpers
Pentathletes
Olympic athletes of Malaya
Athletes (track and field) at the 1972 Summer Olympics
Commonwealth Games competitors for Malaysia
Athletes (track and field) at the 1974 British Commonwealth Games
German people of Chinese descent
German people of Malaysian descent
Southeast Asian Games medalists in athletics
Southeast Asian Games gold medalists for Malaysia